Francis Hall, LL.D. was an Anglican Archdeacon in Ireland in the late eighteenth and early nineteenth centuries.

Hall was educated at Trinity College, Dublin. He was Treasurer of the Clonfert and Kilmacduagh diocese from 1795 to 1800; and the Archdeacon of Kilmacduagh from 1797 to 1803.

Notes

Alumni of Trinity College Dublin
Archdeacons of Kilmacduagh
18th-century Irish Anglican priests
19th-century Irish Anglican priests